Jennifer Hunt is a professor of economics at Rutgers University. She previously served as deputy assistant secretary for microeconomic analysis at the U.S. Department of the Treasury after serving a term as Chief Economist to the U.S. Secretary of Labor, serving under acting secretary Seth Harris and Secretary Thomas Perez. She is a research associate at the National Bureau of Economic Research. She has done research in the areas of employment and unemployment policy, immigration, wage inequality, transition economics, crime and corruption. Her past research focused on immigration and innovation in the United States, the U.S. science and engineering workforce, and the 2008-2009 recession in Germany. Her research on immigration has been cited by media in the context of immigration reform legislation, currently under consideration by the U.S. Congress. Her contemporary research focuses primarily on the geographic composition of technology, discrimination, and unemployment.

Education

Jennifer Hunt graduated from the International School of Geneva with an International Baccalaureate degree in 1983. She then studied electrical engineering at Massachusetts Institute of Technology, earning a Scientiæ Baccalaureus in 1987. She then switched fields and studied economics at Harvard University, earning her Ph.D in 1992.

Academic appointments

Jennifer Hunt began her academic career as an assistant professor at Yale University in 1992, becoming an associate professor in 1997. She moved to the University of Montreal in 2001 and McGill University in 2004. She has been a professor at Rutgers since 2011.

Professor Hunt has also held the following visiting positions:
Universitat Autònoma de Barcelona, Institut d’Anàlisi Econòmica, July 2012
University of Milan, Centro Studi Luco d’Agliano, June 2010
University of British Columbia, Department of Economics, 2008-2009
UCLA, Department of Economics, Spring 2006
Dartmouth College, Department of Economics, Spring 2000
German Institute for Economic Research (DIW-Berlin), SOEP Group, Fall 1999
Stanford University, Hoover Institution, National Fellow, 1995-1996

Hunt is a research associate in labor studies at the National Bureau of Economic Research, a research fellow at the Centre for Economic Policy Research in London, and is on the Scientific Advisory Council of the American Institute for Contemporary German Studies in Washington D.C. and the Institut für Arbeitsmarkt- und Berufsforschung in Nuremberg.

Since 2012, Hunt has served as an associate editor of the Journal of Labor Economics. She is also an Editor of the Journal of Comparative Economics.

Research awards
Hunt's paper, "How Much Does Immigration Boost Innovation?" (with coauthor Marjolaine Gauthier-Loiselle) won the American Economic Journal Best Paper in Macroeconomics Prize in 2013. Hunt was honored in 2012 as the keynote speaker at Verein für Socialpolitik annual conference, Göttingen. She was also keynote speaker at INSIDE third annual immigration conference, Barcelona, 2009, and Innis Lecturer at the Canadian Economics Association Meetings, 2004. In 2001 she received the DAAD Prize for Distinguished Scholarship in German Studies, and she was awarded "Best Paper Using the German Socio-Economic Panel 1984-99, scholar under 35," in 2000.

Selected publications

References

American civil servants
21st-century American economists
American women economists
Living people
Harvard University alumni
MIT School of Engineering alumni
International School of Geneva alumni
Chief Economists of the United States Department of Labor
1965 births
Obama administration personnel
21st-century American women